Cooltrain  is a townland in Magheracross civil parish, County Fermanagh. It is 159.89 acres in area.

History
Cooltrain has a rich history. stretching back to the early Post Roman times.

Gallery

References

Townlands of County Fermanagh